Bergshammar (pronunciation Bärjshammar) is a locality situated in the Nyköping Municipality, Södermanland County, Sweden with 790 inhabitants in 2010.

References 

Populated places in Södermanland County
Populated places in Nyköping Municipality